Hu Die (born February 16, 1983), also known as Fang Yuan, is a television hostess for China Central Television. She is from Hanzhong, Shaanxi, China. In December 2007, she became the winner of CCTV's 5th host contest.

Career 
In 2005, Hu Die became a hostess. She hosted program Acting Arama  and Golden Days in CCTV-3.  In December 2007, she became the winner of CCTV's 5th host contest.

In 2008, she hosted Asia Today and China News in CCTV-4. On July 27, 2009, she began to host Morning News. In March 2009, she hosted the interactive program I have questions to the Premier on CCTV-4 during the NPC and CPPCC.

In December 2012, Hu Die hosted 2012 CCTV Champtionship of Internet Motels and Awards Ceremory. In July 2014, she served as a guest of a special program of World Cup of CCTV-5.

In September 2016, she attended CCTV Mid-Autumn Festival Gala.

Personal life 
On April 11, 2015, Hu Die married with director Lu Chuan in Hawaii. On October 22, 2015, she gave birth to her son.

Discography

References 

1983 births
Living people
CCTV television presenters
People from Hanzhong